Arturo Díaz (born 17 April 1954) is a Cuban wrestler. He competed in two events at the 1980 Summer Olympics.

References

1954 births
Living people
Cuban male sport wrestlers
Olympic wrestlers of Cuba
Wrestlers at the 1980 Summer Olympics
Place of birth missing (living people)
Pan American Games medalists in wrestling
Pan American Games gold medalists for Cuba
Pan American Games silver medalists for Cuba
Wrestlers at the 1979 Pan American Games
Wrestlers at the 1987 Pan American Games
Medalists at the 1979 Pan American Games
20th-century Cuban people
21st-century Cuban people